

List of mayors

References

 
Trenton, New Jersey